The Mendelssohn Palace is a Neoclassical-style building in Berlin-Mitte. Designed by the architects Martin Gropius and Heino Schmieden, the palace was completed in 1893. The building functioned as a residence- and bank building for the Mendelssohn family. Partly destroyed in World War II, the undamaged remnant of the palace is currently seat of a business company.

Bibliography
 "Bankhaus Mendelssohn & Co." in Handbuch der Deutschen Kunstdenkmäler. München/Berlin: Deutscher Kunstverlag, 2006. pp. 123.

External links
 "Mendelssohn-Palais", history, data and information about the building at the official website of the palace (in German)

Houses completed in 1893
Buildings and structures in Mitte
Palaces in Berlin
Neoclassical architecture in Germany